The Luzège is a  long river in the Corrèze département, south-central France. It flows generally south. It is a right tributary of the Dordogne, into which it flows just to the south of Laval-sur-Luzège.

Communes along its course
This list is ordered from source to mouth: Meymac, Combressol, Maussac, Darnets, Palisse, Lamazière-Basse, Moustier-Ventadour, Saint-Hilaire-Foissac, Lapleau, Saint-Pantaléon-de-Lapleau, Soursac, Laval-sur-Luzège

References

Rivers of France
Rivers of Corrèze
Rivers of Nouvelle-Aquitaine